Delicious Party Pretty Cure is the nineteenth television anime series in Izumi Todo's Pretty Cure franchise, produced by Asahi Broadcasting Corporation and animated by Toei Animation. The series aired in Japan from February 6, 2022 to January 29, 2023, succeeding Tropical-Rouge! Pretty Cure in its time slot and succeded by Soaring Sky! Pretty Cure. The opening theme is "Cheers！Delicious Party Pretty Cure" (Cheers！デリシャスパーティプリキュア) by Machico while the first ending theme is "Delicious Happy Days" (DELICIOUS HAPPY DAYS) by Chihaya Yoshitake. Starting from episode 21, "Delicious Heart" (ココロデリシャス) by Rico Sasaki takes over as the second ending.


Episode list

Notes

References

Delicious Party Pretty Cure